Sarah-Ève Coutu-Godbout (born June 16, 1997) is a Canadian ice hockey player who currently plays with the AIK Hockey Dam of the Swedish Women's Hockey League (SWHL). She won a silver medal with Team Canada at the 2016 IIHF World Women's U18 Championship.

Playing career 
Coutu-Godbout attended Cégep Limoilou in Québec City for secondary school, where she studied administration and economics. While studying, she played for the cégep's ice hockey team, Les Titans, putting up 51 points in 43 games. In 2015, she was the recipient of a $1500 bursary from the NHL's Canadiens de Montréal, along with teammate Élizabeth Giguère, for excellence in women's youth hockey in Québec.

In 2016, she moved to Connecticut in the United States to study entrepreneurship and play for Quinnipiac University, a member institution of the ECAC Hockey conference. Across the next four years with the Quinnipiac Bobcats, she would score 62 points in 122 NCAA games. After a bureaucratic delay concerning her language qualifications for eligibility - she was the first native francophone to play for Quinnipiac - she scored 6 points in 22 games in her rookie season and was named ECAC Rookie of the Month in February 2017. She finished fourth and fifth on the team in goals scored in her second and third years, respectively, before breaking out to score 16 goals in her senior season to lead the team in goals.

During her time in university, she had openly expressed her desire to play in the PHF. After graduating, she had originally explored opportunities from teams in Sweden, before deciding against it due to uncertainty from the COVID-19 pandemic. In May 2020, she signed her first professional contract with the expansion Toronto Six of the PHF, the seventh player to sign with the team, and turned down an offer from the Connecticut Whale.

International play 
Coutu-Godbout played for Team Canada at the 2015 IIHF World Women's U18 Championship, scoring one goal in five games as the country won silver.

Career statistics

Regular season and playoffs

Sources:

International

References

External links 
 

1997 births
Living people
Canadian women's ice hockey forwards
Sportspeople from Rouyn-Noranda
Ice hockey people from Quebec
Toronto Six players
Quinnipiac Bobcats women's ice hockey players
Canadian expatriate ice hockey players in the United States
AIK Hockey Dam players
Canadian expatriate ice hockey players in Sweden